Events in the year 1949 in Indonesia. The country had an estimated population of   74,530,300.

Incumbents
 President: Sukarno
 Vice President: Mohammad Hatta
 Prime Minister: Mohammad Hatta, Susanto Tirtoprodjo (Acting)
 Chief Justice: Kusumah Atmaja

Events

 Continuing Indonesian National Revolution
 28 January - Adoption of the United Nations Security Council Resolution 67
 7 May - Roem–Van Roijen Agreement
 12 May - Establishment of the Apostolic Prefecture of Hollandia
 1 July - Founding of the Jawa Pos newspaper
 4 August - Disestablishment of the First Hatta Cabinet
 4 August - The Second Hatta Cabinet takes office
 23 August - 2 November - Dutch–Indonesian Round Table Conference
 August - Establishment of the Kolese Loyola high school, in Semarang
 5 October - Adoption of the United Nations Security Council Resolution 76
 15 October - Founding of the Universitas Nasional
 14 December - Dissolution of the Second Hatta Cabinet
 19 December - Founding of the Gadjah Mada University, in Yogyakarta
 27 December - Treaty of The Hague
 27 December - Establishment of the Netherlands-Indonesian Union
 27 December - End of the Indonesian National Revolution with an Indonesian victory
 27 December - The Susanto Cabinet takes office

References

 
1940s in Indonesia
Years of the 20th century in Indonesia